Kaset may refer to:

Amphoe Kaset Sombun (Thai: เกษตรสมบูรณ์) is a district in Chaiyaphum Province, Thailand
Amphoe Kaset Wisai (Thai: เกษตรวิสัย) is a district in Roi Et Province, Thailand
Kaset Green Hawk, aerial display team of the Bureau of Royal Rainmaking and Agricultural Aviation (KASET) of Thailand
Kaset Rojananil, Commander of the Royal Thai Air Force

Kaset is also the word for cassette in Indonesian and Turkish.